Saints & Strangers is an American drama television two-part miniseries. It tells the story of the Mayflower voyage and chronicles the Pilgrims' first year in America and the first Thanksgiving in 1621. The program aired on the National Geographic Channel and premiered on November 22, 2015.

Plot
The miniseries chronicles the real story of the Pilgrims: their harrowing voyage from England to America aboard the Mayflower and settling in Plymouth, Massachusetts; vying to survive in the harsh climate; their struggles with the local tribes, and celebrating their first Thanksgiving with the natives, the Pokanoket people, in 1621.

Production
The Indigenous characters in the miniseries speak Western Abenaki, a language similar to but distinct from that which would have been spoken by the Wampanoag of the time. National Geographic employed a dialect coach to teach the language to the actors. The miniseries was shot at the Cape Town Film Studios in South Africa.

Cast

Episodes
Note: The miniseries was aired in two parts consisting of two-hour episodes; however, the credits list four parts with four different writers.

Reception 
Saints & Strangers received generally positive reviews from critics. Review aggregator Rotten Tomatoes gives the season a rating of 80%, based on 20 reviews, with an average rating of 6.9/10. The site's consensus states, "Saints & Strangers presents an immersive, action-fueled portrait of early American settler life, although it's slightly hampered by its somewhat shallow, didactic approach."
Metacritic gives the miniseries a score of 70 out of 100, based on 14 critics, indicating "generally favorable reviews".

Critics give the miniseries mixed reviews. Keith Uhlich of The Hollywood Reporter writes, "Not quite a turkey, pilgrim. Nat Geo's two-night miniseries about the first Thanksgiving is admirable in parts, though bland overall." Maureen Ryan of Variety writes, "The serious intent of "Saints" trips it up at times; many characters remain one-dimensional, and some sequences are plodding or repetitive. That said, the mini features nuanced work in a number of the Native Americans portrayals—often the best-developed characters on the screen."

Wampanoag tribal representatives said that National Geographic asked them for linguistic assistance but severed their relationship when they asked to consult on their tribe's portrayal, instead writing the script with the distantly related language of West Abenaki. They objected to the portrayal of their tribe as violent and murderous, saying the incidents portrayed were at odds with documented historical facts.

Saints & Strangers received three Critics Choice Award Nominations as well as a WGA Award nomination for Best Television Original Long Form for which it won.

References

External links

2010s American drama television series
English-language television shows
National Geographic (American TV channel) original programming
Thanksgiving television specials
Television series set in the 17th century
Television shows about Native Americans